Juan Enrique Cortada Tirado (1864—1937) was a Puerto Rican politician, businessman, and landowner. He served as a member of the Senate of Puerto Rico from 1917 to 1920.

Early years and studies

Juan Cortada Tirado was born in 1864 to Juan Cortada y Quintana who was the 76th Mayor of Ponce, Puerto Rico and Mercedes Tirado Y Hinsch. He had a younger brother called Eduardo.

Professional career

From an early age, Cortada worked at his father's estate. Some sources say that his father ceded the ownership of the Hacienda Descalabrado to him and his brother in 1871, but never registered it.

In 1887, Cortada was arrested in Santa Isabel on orders of General Romualdo Palacios for conspiring against the Spanish Government.

After his release, he and his brother assumed ownership of Hacienda Descalabrado, which then became Central Cortada. In the first years of the 20th Century, Central Cortada became the second largest sugar producer in the island.

Political career
In 1917, Cortada was elected to the first Puerto Rican Senate, representing the District of Ponce for the Republican Party.

See also

 Ponce, Puerto Rico
 List of Puerto Ricans

References

1864 births
1937 deaths
Members of the Senate of Puerto Rico
Politicians from Ponce